The National Emergency Management Agency or NEMA is a paramilitary government agency overseeing emergency services in Mongolia. It was established with the duty to conduct nationwide post-disaster activities. It is similar to the Russian Ministry of Emergency Situations. It is responsible for developing environmental legislation as well as managing the fall out from natural disasters and conducting rescue work.

The Civil Defense Directorate of the Mongolian Armed Forces is the main executive body responsible for implementing civil defense measures, functioning under the direct authority by the Minister of Defense.

History 
The first civil defense in the country was established in 1964 as an affiliated service to the Mongolian People's Army. Emergency services in the country have dated back to 1922 when they were first formed at the initiative of the partisan leader Damdin Sükhbaatar. The unit established in the 1960s was known as the 122nd Civil Defense Battalion of the MPA as part of the expansion of the army. All citizens were obliged to participate in civil defense training organized by the Civil Defense Office of the Ministry of Defense. In 1982, there were 600 civil defense units in Mongolia. Since the 1980s, civil defense exercises have been directed toward the improvement of the operational stability of organizations and enterprises. The Law on the Civil Defense of Mongolia, adopted by the State Great Hural in 1994, stated that "civil defense is a complex of measures aimed at the prevention, protection and rescue of the population and their property from afflictions caused by mass destruction weapons". In 1997, the Mongolian Armed Forces had 20,000 military personnel, 500 of which were part of the civil defense forces. NEMA was established by the State Great Khural in June 2003 and is currently part of the Government of Mongolia. In 2017, a chemical branch was formed.

Organization

General leadership and organizational structure 
The Prime Minister of Mongolia is assigned as the head of the civil defense while the defense minister as the Chairman of the State Permanent Emergency Commission. The governors of administrative areas (provinces, capital city, soums and districts), in their capacity as heads of local civil defense, are part civil defense system. It has branches in all 21 Aimags as well as the capital of Ulaanbaatar, which both serves as a NEMA division and the national headquarters.

Units/Departments 

 Western Region
 Emergency Department of Khovd aimag
 Emergency Department of Uvs aimag
 Emergency Department of Bayan-Ulgii aimag
 Emergency Department of Zavkhan aimag
 Emergency Department of Gobi-Altai aimag

 Northern Region
 Emergency Department of Orkhon aimag
 Emergency Department of Khuvsgul aimag
 Emergency Department of Darkhan
 Emergency Department of Selenge aimag
 Emergency Department of Arkhangai aimag
 Emergency Department of Bulgan aimag
 Emergency Department of Tuv aimag

 Eastern Region
 Emergency Department of Dornod aimag
 Emergency Department of Khentii aimag
 Emergency Department of Sukhbaatar aimag

 Southern Region
 Emergency Department of Umnugovi aimag
 Emergency Department of Bayankhongor aimag
 Emergency Department of Uvurkhangai aimag
 Emergency Department of Dundgobi aimag
 Emergency Department of Gobisumber aimag
 Emergency Department of Dornogovi aimag

 Ulaanbaatar Region
 Capital City Emergency Department
 Emergency Department of Baganuur District
 Emergency Department of Bagakhangai District
 Emergency Department of Bayangol District
 Emergency Department of Bayanzurkh District
 Emergency Department of Nalaikh District
 Emergency Department of SKH District
 Emergency Department of Sukhbaatar District
 Emergency Department of Khan-uul District
 Emergency Department of Chingeltei District

 NEMA Units
 National Rescue Brigade
 Institute for Disasters
 Training Center
 Physical Sports and Technical Committee

Activities 
The Law on the Defense of Mongolia permits the Mongolian Armed Forces to be involved in civil defense activities. During the steppe fires in 1996, contingents of the armed forces participated in civil defense activities in 5-8 provinces. In the late 1960s, the Minister of Defense organized the Music Group of the Civil Defense, which has since 2009 been known as the Emergency Services Band and has provided military music at the emergency department level, as well as promoting NEMA in community, representing it at cultural events.

Heads 
 Ukhnaagiin Khürelsükh (2004–2006)
 P. Dash (30 May-24 June 2007)
 B. Jargalsaikhan (24 June 2007-?)
 Brigadier General G.Ariunbuyan (since 18 July 2020)

See also 
 Civil defense by country
 National Emergency Management Agency (disambiguation)

References

External links 
 Official links

Government agencies of Mongolia
Ministries established in 2003
2003 establishments in Mongolia
Military of Mongolia